Oakboro is a town in Stanly County, North Carolina, United States. The population was 1,859 at the 2010 census.

Geography
Oakboro is located at  (35.229159, -80.332440).

History

Oakboro developed because of a predecessor of the (first) Norfolk Southern Railway. The original town started at a natural salt lick called Big Lick. When the railroad passed through in 1913, the town moved closer to the railroad and became "Furr Town". In 1915, the name was changed to Oakboro.

The Oakboro Cotton Mill was a major employer in the 1940s and 1950s while cotton was still "king" of the South. Later, the mill moved across the railroad to form Stanly Knitting Mills.

Demographics

2020 census

As of the 2020 United States census, there were 2,128 people, 766 households, and 551 families residing in the town.

2000 census
At the 2000 census, there were 1,198 people, 485 households and 361 families residing in the town. The population density was 595.1 per square mile (230.1/km). There were 535 housing units at an average density of 265.8 per square mile (102.8/km). The racial makeup of the town was 75.79% White, 19.70% African American, 0.67% Native American, 0.33% Asian, 2.25% from other races, and 1.25% from two or more races. Hispanic or Latino of any race were 3.42% of the population.

There were 485 households, of which 29.7% had children under the age of 18 living with them, 56.3% were married couples living together, 14.2% had a female householder with no husband present, and 25.4% were non-families. 23.7% of all households were made up of individuals, and 11.8% had someone living alone who was 65 years of age or older. The average household size was 2.46 and the average family size was 2.86.

23.2% of the population were under the age of 18, 8.5% from 18 to 24, 28.6% from 25 to 44, 24.9% from 45 to 64, and 14.8% who were 65 years of age or older. The median age was 38 years. For every 100 females, there were 91.1 males. For every 100 females age 18 and over, there were 88.5 males.

The median household income was $41,369 and the median family income was $46,711. Males had a median income of $33,482 compared with $21,696 for females. The per capita income for the town was $18,079. About 8.6% of families and 11.5% of the population were below the poverty line, including 17.3% of those under age 18 and 21.4% of those age 65 or over.

Culture
Today Oakboro is known for its annual Independence Day parade and for hosting a classic car cruise-in on the fourth Friday of every month.

Notable person
 Bruton Smith, CEO of Speedway Motorsports.

References

External links
 Official website
 Oakboro Cruise-In

Towns in Stanly County, North Carolina
Towns in North Carolina
Populated places established in 1913
1913 establishments in North Carolina